"'Happy Sad" is the first single from Irish singer-songwriter Gemma Hayes' second album, The Roads Don't Love You, released in 2005 on the Source Records label.

Track listing

CD 1

 "Happy Sad"
 "Holy Places"

7"
 "Happy Sad"
 "Bad Day"

Charts

References

2002 songs
Gemma Hayes songs
Songs written by Gemma Hayes
Songs written by Stephin Merritt